The May Uprising was a coup d'état attempt by the Armenian Bolsheviks that started in Alexandropol (modern-day Gyumri) on May 10, 1920. It was eventually suppressed by the Armenian government on May 14 and its leaders executed. Although the revolt failed, Armenia was Sovietized after the 11th Army of Soviet Russia invaded the country in November 1920 and the Turkish Nationalists occupied the western half of the country. The revolt and its executed leaders were praised during the Soviet period from 1920 until the late 1980s, when the Karabakh movement began and anti-Soviet sentiment rose in Armenia – The revolt remains a controversial topic in Armenia.

Background
Since the establishment of the Republic of Armenia in 1918, the political parties and different factions, for the most part, avoided internal conflicts or rebellions against the dominant Dashnak party as the country suffered from deep economic and demographic crises and was at some point during its two-year existence at war with three of four neighboring countries (Turkey, Azerbaijan, Georgia). This changed after by the advance of Bolshevik forces into the South Caucasus in early 1920. The Armenian Communist Party, operating in secrecy, was founded in January 1920 to fight against the "vilifying the Allied Powers and their Dashnakist 'collaborators'." The uprising was mainly carried out by Bolsheviks born in Russian Armenia, as most of the Armenian refugees from the Ottoman Empire were "aloof" or "hostile" to Bolshevism. Conversely, part of the Armenian army was sympathetic to the uprising, following the direction of the mutineering Captain  who commanded the armored train named Vardan Zoravar in Alexandropol since February 1919.

Revolt
Encouraged by the Red Army invasion of Azerbaijan in late April 1920, the Armenian Bolsheviks headed by Avis Nurijanyan staged a revolt in May. The events preceding the revolt started on May 1, 1920, International Workers' Day, with the Bolsheviks demonstrating against the government of Armenia in capital Yerevan and other cities.

The revolt escalated after the armored train Vardan Zoravar and its crew under Musayelyan's command joined the Bolshevik rebels who had formed a revolutionary committee (Armkom) and proclaimed Armenia a Soviet state in Alexandopol on May 10. The Bolshevik rebels successfully took over Alexandropol, Kars and Sarikamis. On May 5, 1920, the government (the cabinet) of Alexander Khatisian resigned and new one was formed under Hamo Ohanjanyan's leadership. It was entirely made up of Dashnak party members. The parliament gave up its rights to the government since Armenia was under state of emergency. Sebouh Nersesian was appointed commander to suppress the revolt. On May 13 his unit reached Alexandropol and by the next day the rebels left the city and the government forces entered the city and established order.

Aftermath
The leaders of the revolt, including Sargis Musayelyan and Ghukas Ghukasyan, were initially imprisoned as the Soviet government on 4 June warning that diplomatic relations would be "detrimented" if the "persecution of Communists continued" and the fact that several notable Dashnaks were imprisoned in Soviet Russia and Azerbaijan at the time. Following the Soviet invasion of Zangezur and the capture and torture of Dashnaks The Communist party of Armenia was banned in Armenia. Armenia's domestic situation deteoriated as the government lost its prestige among the people and hope among Allied officials. After three months, the Treaty of Alexandropol was signed on December 3, effectively partitioning Armenia between Turkish and the Soviet rule. A new government in the remainder of independent Armenia then cleared the way for a new government that accomplished the purpose sought in the uprising. The Armenian Soviet Socialist Republic was declared and became a constituent part of the Union of Soviet Socialist Republics in 1922, finally regaining its independence upon the breakup of the USSR in 1991.

Legacy

Soviet period
The revolt was extensively sharply criticized and praised in Soviet Armenia and Soviet historiography, presented as a "heroic struggle". Several books were written on it. Numerous settlements in Soviet Armenia were named after notable Bolshevik participants of the revolt, including Gandzak (formerly named Batikian after Batik Batikian), Sarukhan (after Hovhannes Sarukhanian), Nahapetavan (after Nahapet Kurghinian), Gharibjanyan (after Bagrat Gharibjanyan), Musayelian (after Sargis Musayelian), Mayisyan (after the "May uprising" itself"), Ashotsk (formerly named Ghukasyan after Ghukas Ghukasyan).

A statue of Ghukas Ghukasyan was erected in 1935 in the park near the Agrarian University in central Yerevan. The statue was blown up in 1990, during the height of the anti-Soviet struggle in Armenia. In 2009, the statue of prominent Armenian astrophysicist Viktor Hambardzumyan was put on its place. The central square of Armenia's second largest city Gyumri (called Leninakan during the Soviet period) was called after the revolt. It is now called Vardanants Square.

Republic of Armenia (1991–present)
The revolt remains a somewhat controversial topic even in post-Soviet Armenia. According to a study of Armenian school textbooks "the tone of the account remains fairly restrained and neutral, a certain interpretation of the events is not imposed on the students." The use of the term "uprising" in these textbooks, however—as opposed to "rebellion", as with contemporary instances of Muslim unrest—betrays a slight sympathy towards the Bolsheviks.

During a 2010 anti-government rally, Armenia's first president and opposition leader Levon Ter-Petrosyan stated:

See also
Sovietization of Armenia
1920 Georgian coup attempt
February Uprising

References

Bibliography

Bolshevik uprisings
1920 in Armenia
Conflicts in 1920
May 1920 events